The Ministry of Regional Development and EU Funds of the Republic of Croatia is the ministry in the Government of Croatia which is in charge of planning and implementation of regional development policies, activities related to harmonization with the European Union in the field of regional policy and the use of funds from the European Union.

List of ministers

Notes
 nb 1.   Served as Minister of Regional Development, Forestry and Water Management

References

External links 
 

Regional Development and EU Funds
Ministries established in 2008
2008 establishments in Croatia